The Kalenjin are a group of tribes designated as Highland Nilotes and are descended from Maliri people (thus related to Daasanach of Ethiopia.) The Kalenjin are cousins with Datooga people of Tanzania. In contrast, their designation groups them with other Nilotes including Maasai, Luo, Turkana and Nuer, Dinka among others. They are indigenous to East Africa, residing mainly in what was formerly the Rift Valley Province in Kenya and Eastern slopes of Mount Elgon in Uganda. Upon their arrival in the forest region of Mau, the Kalenjin assimilated the aboriginal hunter-gatherer people known as Okiek. They number 6,358,113 individuals per the Kenyan 2019 census and an estimated 300,000 in Uganda mainly in Kapchorwa, Kween and Bukwo districts.  They have been divided into 11 culturally and linguistically related tribes: Kipsigis (1.9 million), Nandi (937,000), Sebei (350, 000) Keiyo (251, 000), Marakwet (119, 000), Sabaot (296,000), Pokots (778, 000), Tugen (197, 556), Terik (23, 000), Sengwer (10, 800), and Ogiek (52, 000). The Kalenjin speak the Nadi-Marakweta languages but can also be inclusive of Akie language in Tanzania and Pokot language spoken in Kenya; all being classified collectively as Kalenjin Language; while in combination with Datooga languages of Tanzania, this cluster is called Southern Nilotic languages.

Prehistory

Origins

 

Linguistic evidence points to the eastern Middle Nile Basin south of the Abbai River, as the nursery of the Nilotic languages. That is to say south-east of present-day Khartoum.

It is thought that beginning in the second millennium B.C., particular Nilotic speaking communities began to move southward into present-day South Sudan where most settled and that the societies today referred to as the Southern Nilotes pushed further on, reaching what is present-day north-eastern Uganda by 1000 B.C.

Linguist Christopher Ehret proposes that between 1000 and 700 BC, the Southern Nilotic speaking communities, who kept domestic stock and possibly cultivated sorghum and finger millet, 
lived next to an Eastern Cushitic speaking community with whom they had significant cultural interaction. The general location of this point of cultural exchange being somewhere near the common border between Sudan, Uganda, Kenya, and Ethiopia.

Ehret suggests that the cultural exchange perceived in borrowed loan words, adoption of the practice of circumcision and the cyclical system of age-set organisation dates to this period.

Neolithic

The arrival of the Southern Nilotes on the East African archaeological scene is correlated with the appearance of the prehistoric lithic industry and pottery tradition referred to as the Elmenteitan culture. The bearers of the Elmenteitan culture developed a distinct pattern of land use, hunting and pastoralism on the western plains of Kenya during the East African Pastoral Neolithic. Its earliest recorded appearance dates to the ninth century BC.

Certain distinct traits of the Southern Nilotes, notably in pottery styles, lithic industry and burial practices, are evident in the archaeological record.

Ehret suggests that around the fifth and sixth centuries BC, the speakers of the Southern Nilotic languages split into two major divisions – the proto-Kalenjin and the proto-Datooga. The former took shape among those residing to the north of the Mau range while the latter took shape among sections that moved into the Mara and Loita plains south of the western highlands.

Pastoral iron age

Early iron-age
The material culture referred to as Sirikwa is seen as a development from the local pastoral neolithic (i.e. Elmenteitan culture), as well as a locally limited transition from the Neolithic to the Iron Age.

Radiocarbon dating of archaeological excavations done in Rongai (Deloraine) have ranged in date from around 985 to 1300 A.D and have been associated with the early development phase of the Sirikwa culture. Lithics from Deloraine Farm site show that people were abandoning previous technological strategies in favor of more expedient tool production as iron was entering common use. The spread of iron technology led to the abandonment of many aspects of Pastoral Neolithic material culture and practices.

From the Central Rift, the culture radiated outwards toward the western highlands, the Mt. Elgon region and possibly into Uganda.

Late iron-age
The Sirikwa culture was the predominant Kenyan hinterland archaeological culture of the Pastoral Iron Age, c.2000 BP. The name Sirikwa derives from a community that occupied the Uasin Gishu plateau perhaps as late as the 17th or 18th century. Seen to have developed out of the Elmenteitan culture of the East African Pastoral Neolithic c.3300-1200 BP, the Sirikwa culture was followed in much of its area by the Kalenjin, Maa, western and central Kenyan communities of the 18th and 19th centuries.

Archaeological evidence indicates a highly sedentary way of life and a cultural commitment to a closed defensive system for both community and livestock during the Iron Age. Family homesteads featured small individual family stock pens, elaborate gate-works and sentry points and houses facing into the homestead; defensive methods primarily designed to proof against individual thieves or small groups of rustlers hoping to succeed by stealth. Coins of Indian and English origin, some dating to this period have been found at the Hyrax Hill archaeological site and may indicate contacts with international trade networks.

At their greatest extent, their territories covered the highlands from the Chepalungu and Mau forests northwards as far as the Cherangany Hills and Mount Elgon. There was also a south-eastern projection, at least in the early period, into the elevated Rift grasslands of Nakuru which was taken over permanently by the Maasai, probably no later than the seventeenth century.

History

Pre-19th century
A body of oral traditions from various East African communities points to the presence of at least four significant Kalenjin-speaking population groups present prior to the 19th century. The earliest mention appears to be of the Lumbwa. Meru oral history describes the arrival of their ancestors at Mount Kenya where they interacted with this community. The Lumbwa occupied the lower reaches of Mount Kenya though the extent of their territory is presently unclear.

North-east of this community, across the Rift Valley, a community known as the Chok (later Suk) occupied the Elgeyo escarpment. Pokot oral history describes their way of life, as that of the Chemwal whose country may have been known as Chemngal, a community that appears to have lived in association with the Chok. The Chemwal appear to have been referred to as Siger by the Karamojong on account of a distinctive cowrie shell adornment favored by the women of this community. The area occupied by the Chemwal stretched between Mount Elgon and present day Uasin Gishu as well as into a number of surrounding counties.

Far west, a community known as the Maliri occupied present-day Jie and Dodoth country in Uganda. The Karamojong would eject them from this region over the course of the century and their traditions describe these encounters with the Maliri. The arrival in the district of the latter community is thought by some to be in the region of six to eight centuries ago.

To the north of Chemngal were the Oropom (Orupoi), a late neolithic society whose expansive territory is said to have stretched across Turkana and the surrounding region as well as into Uganda and Sudan. Wilson (1970) who collected traditions relating to the Oropom observed that the corpus of oral literature suggested that, at its tail end, the society "had become effete, after enjoying for a long period the fruits of a highly developed culture". Bordering the Maliri in Uganda were the Karamojong, an Iron Age community that practiced a pastoral way of life.

Towards the end of 18th century and through the 19th century, a series of droughts, plagues of locusts, epidemics, and in the final decades of the 19th century, a rapid succession of sub-continental epizootics affected these communities. There is an early record of the great Laparanat drought c.1785 that affected the Karamajong. However, for communities then resident in what is present-day Kenya many disaster narratives relate the start with the Aoyate, an acute meteorological drought that affected much of East and Southern Africa. Nile records distinctly indicate a start about 1800 while oral narratives and the few written records indicate peak aridity during the 1830s resulting in a notable famine in 1836. This arid period, and the consequent series of events, have been referred to as Mutai.

A feature of the Mutai was increased conflict between neighboring communities, most noted of these has been the Iloikop wars.

19th century

Cultural changes, particularly the innovation of heavier and deadlier spears amongst the Loikop are seen to have led to significant changes in methods and scale of raiding during the 19th century. The change in methods introduced by the Loikop also consisted of fundamental differences of strategy, in fighting and defense, and also in organization of settlements and of political life.

The cultural changes played a part in significant southward expansion of Loikop territory from a base east of Lake Turkana. This expansion led to the development of three groupings within Loikop society. The Samburu who occupied the 'original' country east of Lake Turkana as well as the Laikipia plateau. The Uasin Gishu occupied the grass plateaus now known as the Uasin Gishu and Mau while the Maasai territory extended from Naivasha to Kilimanjaro. This expansion was subsequently followed by the Iloikop wars.

The expansion of Turkana and Loikop societies led to significant change within the Kalenjin-speaking society. Some communities were annihilated by the combined effects of the Mutai of the 19th century while others adapted to the new era.

Members of collapsing communities were usually assimilated into ascending identities.

Significant cultural change also occurred. Guarding cattle on the plateaus depended less on elaborate defenses and more on mobility and cooperation. Both of these requiring new grazing and herd-management strategies. The practice of the later Kalenjin – that is, after they had abandoned the Sirikwa pattern and had ceased in effect to be Sirikwa – illustrates this change vividly. On their reduced pastures, notably on the borders of the Uasin Gishu plateau, when bodies of raiders approached they would relay the alarm from ridge to ridge, so that the herds could be combined and rushed to the cover of the forests. There, the approaches to the glades would be defended by concealed archers, and the advantage would be turned against the spears of the plains warriors.

More than any of the other sections, the Nandi and Kipsigis, in response to Maasai expansion, borrowed from the Maasai some of the traits that would distinguish them from other Kalenjin: large-scale economic dependence on herding, military organization and aggressive cattle raiding, as well as centralized religious-political leadership. By the mid-nineteenth century, both these communities were expanding at the expense of the Maasai.

The Iloikop wars ended in the 1870s with the defeat and dispersal of the Laikipiak. However, the new territory acquired by the Maasai was vast and left them overextended thus unable to occupy it effectively. This left them open to encroachment by other communities. By the early 1880s, Kamba, Kikuyu and Kalenjin raiders were making inroads into Maasai territory, and the Maasai were struggling to control their resources of cattle and grazing land.

Around this time, two instances of epizootics broke out in the Rift Valley region. In 1883, bovine Pleuro-Pneumonia spread from the north and lingered for several years. The effect of this was to cause the Loikop to regroup and to go out raiding more aggressively to replenish their herds. This was followed by a far more serious outbreak of Rinderpest which occurred in 1891.

This period – characterized by disasters, including a rinderpest epidemic, other stock diseases, drought, mass starvation, and smallpox was referred to as a Mutai.

Traditional way of life

The nineteenth century saw massive upheaval among the Sirikwa societies, old identities such as the Maliri and the Chok were annihilated or assimilated giving way to new identities such as the Pokot. Others like the Sengwer and Lumbwa acculturated to the new reality, merging and dropping their old identities to become Nandi and Kipsigis. These new societies retained many elements of their old way of life – like the iron-age Sirikwa societies they were primarily semi-nomadic pastoralists. Their economy revolved around raising livestock and cultivating sorghum and pearl millet on the western highlands of Kenya as it had since at least the last millennium B.C. 

There appear to have been areas of specialization across different regions, communities living on the Elgeyo escarpment for instance traditionally focused on irrigated cultivation. A variety of crops had been borrowed from the neighboring Bantu communities and New World foods introduced following the arrival of the Portuguese on the Swahili coast during the fifteenth century. Of these, indigenous vegetables and herbs, beans, pumpkins, sweet potatoes and tobacco were grown widely while maize and bananas were also cultivated though in small quantities.

They traded locally for goods such as honey, pottery, tobacco pipes and weaponry as well as medical and magical services while connections to international markets supplied foreign goods such as iron wire and cloth in exchange for ivory. The long tradition of beadwork benefited from the introduction of a variety of beads from European markets.

Their territory was not as a whole recognized as a geographic locality. However, there was a standardized set of classifications for geographic localities across the respective territories. Of these geographic classifications, the Kokwet was the most significant political and judicial unit among the Kalenjin. The governing body of each kokwet was its kokwet council; the word kokwet was in fact variously used to mean the whole neighbourhood, its council and the place where the council met. The head of kokwet was poyop kok (village elder).

Social order was regulated by Kamuratanet and cultural life largely revolved around its teaching through folklore and observation of the various tumwek (rituals/customs), the important one's being Tumdo (Initiation) and the tumwek of marriage such as Koito. The Saget'ab eito ceremony was held every number of years to mark the change of 'ages' and the Kipsundet festivals celebrated every September (Kipsunde) and October (Kipsunde oeng) to mark the change in seasons.

To a significant extent however, the Maasai era fundamentally changed the character of the Sirikwa/Kalenjin-speaking communities, the magnitude of which still remains unclear.

20th century

The latter decades of the nineteenth century, saw the early European explorers start advancing into the interior of Kenya. By this time, the Kalenjin – more so the Nandi, had acquired a fearsome reputation. Thompson was warned in 1883 to avoid the country of the Nandi, who were known for attacks on strangers and caravans that would attempt to scale the great massif of the Mau. 

Nonetheless, trade relations were established between the Kalenjin and incoming British. This was tempered on the Kalenjin side by the prophesies of various seers. Among the Nandi, Kimnyole had warned that contact with the Europeans would have a significant impact on the Nandi while Mongo was said to have warned against fighting the Europeans.

Matson, in his account of the resistance, shows 'how the irresponsible actions of two British traders, Dick and West, quickly upset the precarious modus vivendi between the Nandi and incoming British'. Conflict, led on the Nandi side by Koitalel Arap Samoei – Nandi Orkoiyot at the time, was triggered by West's killing in 1895.

The East Africa Protectorate, Foreign Office, and missionary societies administrations reacted to West's death by organizing invasions of Nandi in 1895 and 1897. Invading forces were able to inflict sporadic losses upon Nandi warriors, steal hundreds of livestock, and burn villages, but were not able to end Nandi resistance.

1897 also saw the colonial government set up base in Eldama Ravine under the leadership of certain Messrs. Ternan and Grant, an intrusion that was not taken to kindly by the Lembus community. This triggered conflict between the Lembus and the British, the latter of whom fielded Maasai and Nubian soldiers and porters.

The British eventually overcame the Lembus following which Grant and Lembus elder's negotiated a peace agreement. During the negotiations, the Lembus were prevailed upon by Grant to state what they would not harm nor kill, to which the response was women. As such, they exchanged a girl from the Kimeito clan while Grant offered a white bull as a gesture of peace and friendship. This agreement was known as the Kerkwony Agreement. The negotiations were held where Kerkwony Stadium stands today.

On 19 October 1905, on the grounds of what is now Nandi Bears Club, Arap Samoei was asked to meet Col Richard Meinertzhagen for a truce. A grand-nephew of one of Arap Samoei's bodyguards later noted that "There were about 22 of them who went for a meeting with the (European) that day. Koitalel Arap Samoei had been advised not to shake hands because if he did, that would give him away as the leader. But he extended his hand and was shot immediately". Koitalel's death led to the end of the Nandi resistance.

Colonial period

Politics and identity
Until the mid-20th century, the Kalenjin did not have a common name and were usually referred to as the 'Nandi-speaking tribes' by scholars and colonial administration officials.

Starting in the 1940s, individuals from the various 'Nandi-speaking tribes' who had been drafted to fight in World War II (1939–1945) began using the term Kale or Kore (a term that denoted scarification of a warrior who had killed an enemy in battle) to refer to themselves. At about the same time, a popular local radio broadcaster by the name of John Chemallan would introduce his wartime broadcasts show with the phrase Kalenjok meaning "I tell You" (when said to many people). This would influence a group of fourteen young 'Nandi-speaking' men attending Alliance School and who were trying to find a name for their peer group. They would call it Kalenjin meaning "I tell you" (when said to one person). The word Kalenjin was gaining currency as a term to denote all the 'Nandi-speaking' tribes. This identity would be consolidated with the founding of the Kalenjin Union in Eldoret in 1948 and the publication of a monthly magazine called Kalenjin in the 1950s. 
 
In 1955 when Mzee Tameno, a Maasai and member of the Legislative Assembly (LEGCO) for Rift Valley, tendered his resignation, the Kalenjin presented one candidate to replace him; Daniel Toroitich arap Moi.

By 1960, concerned with the dominance of the Luo and Kikuyu, Arap Moi and Ronald Ngala formed KADU to defend the interests of the countries smaller ethnicities. They campaigned on a platform of majimboism (devolution) during the 1963 elections but lost to KANU. Shortly after independence in December 1963, Kenyatta convinced Moi to dissolve KADU. This was done in 1964 when KADU dissolved and joined KANU.

Project Scheme Uganda
When Theodor Herzl began his quest to establish a homeland for the Jewish people, he sought out the support of the great powers to help achieve his goal. In 1903, Herzl turned to Great Britain and met with Joseph Chamberlain, the British colonial secretary and others high-ranking officials who agreed in principle to Jewish settlement in East Africa.

At the Sixth Zionist Congress at Basel on 26 August 1903, Herzl proposed the British Uganda Program as a temporary refuge for Jews in Russia in immediate danger. By a vote of 295-178 it was decided to send an expedition ("investigatory commission") to examine the territory proposed. Three days later the British government released an official document allocating a "Jewish territory" in East Africa "on conditions which will enable members to observe their national customs."

While Herzl made it clear that this program would not affect the ultimate aim of Zionism, a Jewish entity in the Land of Israel, the proposal aroused a storm at the Congress and nearly led to a split in the Zionist movement. The Jewish Territorialist Organization (ITO) was formed as a result of the unification of various groups who had supported Herzl's Uganda proposals during the period 1903–1905.

The Uganda Program was finally rejected by the Zionist movement at the Seventh Zionist Congress in 1905, but Nahum Syrkin and Israel Zangwill called an alternative conference to continue the plan of the Uganda scheme.

The fortunes of the territorialist movement depended to no small degree on the seriousness of anti-Semitism on the one hand and the failure of the political dimension of Zionist activity on the other. So, for example, the movement's ranks swelled somewhat following the pogroms in 1905, but declined considerably after the securing of the Balfour Declaration.

Zangwill became the movement's undisputed leader. After the rejection of the Uganda scheme on the grounds of impracticability by the British, Zangwill turned his attention to settlement in Canada and Australia. But opposition from local residents led him to abandon the scheme. Expeditions were sent to Mesopotamia (Iraq), Cyrenaica (Libya) and Angola but little came of these expeditions.

A project that had some concrete success was the Galveston scheme which contemplated the settlement of Jews in the American Southwest, in particular in Texas. The project received the assistance of Jacob Schiff, the American Jewish banker, and some 9,300 Jews arrived in that area between 1907 and 1914, through the Emigration Bureau of the Territorialist organization.

With the publication of the Balfour Declaration, the ITO faced a severe crisis since many of its members came to the conclusion that Eretz-Israel was not so utopian after all. The organization's failure was due to its inability to secure a definite project, and its lack of sensitivity toward the historic and traditional sentiments of Jewish identity.

Religion
Traditional Kalenjin religion was based upon the belief in a supreme god, Asis or Cheptalel, represented in the form of the sun (asista), although the sun itself was not considered to be God. Beneath Asis is Elat, who controls thunder and lightning. Spirits of the dead, oyik, were believed to intervene in the affairs of humans, and were placated with sacrifices of meat and/or beer, called koros . Diviners, called orkoik , were considered to have magical powers and assisted in appeals for rain or to end floods.

Christianity was introduced and rapidly spread through Kalenjin speaking areas during the colonial period. Traditional Kalenjin religion which was undergoing separate change saw a corresponding decline in this time.

Today, nearly everyone claims membership in an organized religion—either Christianity or Islam. Major Christian sects include the Africa Inland Church (AIC), the Church of the Province of Kenya (CPK), and the Roman Catholic Church. Muslims are relatively few in number among the Kalenjin. For the most part, only older people can recall details of traditional religious beliefs.

Food
The colonial period saw the introduction of tea cultivation on a large scale in the Kericho and Nandi highlands. These regions have since played a significant role in establishing Kenya as the world's leading exporter of tea and also in establishing a tea-drinking culture among the Kalenjin. This period also saw the introduction of the mid-day meal as well as the addition of wheat based foods such as bread and less often pancakes and maandazi to the morning meal.

Literacy
A significant cultural change of the colonial period was the introduction and adoption of the Latin script for transcribing first the Bible, and later Kalenjin lore and history.

Recent history

Demographics
According to Kenya's 2019 census, Kalenjin people number 6,358,113 individuals, making it the third-largest ethnic group in Kenya after the Kikuyu and the Luhya.{
  "type": "FeatureCollection",
  "features": [
    {
      "type": "Feature",
      "properties": {},
      "geometry": {
        "type": "Polygon",
        "coordinates": [
          [
            [
              35.592785,
              -0.371987
            ],
            [
              35.580597,
              -0.391383
            ],
            [
              35.585403,
              -0.404945
            ],
            [
              35.59227,
              -0.407861
            ],
            [
              35.705395,
              -0.360498
            ],
            [
              35.720158,
              -0.365464
            ],
            [
              35.733376,
              -0.357398
            ],
            [
              35.735092,
              -0.36856
            ],
            [
              35.74419,
              -0.378515
            ],
            [
              35.761185,
              -0.376966
            ],
            [
              35.824356,
              -0.367356
            ],
            [
              35.868301,
              -0.370789
            ],
            [
              35.888901,
              -0.376968
            ],
            [
              35.91259,
              -0.410094
            ],
            [
              35.928469,
              -0.409494
            ],
            [
              35.965891,
              -0.419538
            ],
            [
              35.979195,
              -0.472921
            ],
            [
              36.054039,
              -0.557723
            ],
            [
              36.046314,
              -0.570593
            ],
            [
              36.034641,
              -0.580033
            ],
            [
              36.009579,
              -0.569395
            ],
            [
              35.974216,
              -0.555152
            ],
            [
              35.946579,
              -0.558578
            ],
            [
              35.933189,
              -0.55034
            ],
            [
              35.905724,
              -0.547592
            ],
            [
              35.891304,
              -0.526652
            ],
            [
              35.854225,
              -0.505026
            ],
            [
              35.833626,
              -0.492308
            ],
            [
              35.837746,
              -0.468623
            ],
            [
              35.830193,
              -0.465878
            ],
            [
              35.827103,
              -0.474459
            ],
            [
              35.816803,
              -0.473773
            ],
            [
              35.817146,
              -0.464854
            ],
            [
              35.811653,
              -0.4573
            ],
            [
              35.797234,
              -0.457645
            ],
            [
              35.795174,
              -0.46777
            ],
            [
              35.79586,
              -0.47344
            ],
            [
              35.780411,
              -0.51326
            ],
            [
              35.776291,
              -0.522872
            ],
            [
              35.773544,
              -0.537975
            ],
            [
              35.747108,
              -0.531796
            ],
            [
              35.736809,
              -0.531455
            ],
            [
              35.721016,
              -0.55205
            ],
            [
              35.711746,
              -0.55514
            ],
            [
              35.712433,
              -0.564409
            ],
            [
              35.71312,
              -0.573678
            ],
            [
              35.707283,
              -0.590841
            ],
            [
              35.694237,
              -0.600454
            ],
            [
              35.685997,
              -0.619334
            ],
            [
              35.685654,
              -0.639244
            ],
            [
              35.678444,
              -0.657093
            ],
            [
              35.670891,
              -0.65984
            ],
            [
              35.662994,
              -0.677004
            ],
            [
              35.639648,
              -0.701713
            ],
            [
              35.606689,
              -0.675642
            ],
            [
              35.59845,
              -0.637179
            ],
            [
              35.572357,
              -0.630325
            ],
            [
              35.549011,
              -0.587759
            ],
            [
              35.450478,
              -0.591708
            ],
            [
              35.488586,
              -0.549288
            ],
            [
              35.491333,
              -0.484752
            ],
            [
              35.467987,
              -0.447675
            ],
            [
              35.451508,
              -0.402362
            ],
            [
              35.450134,
              -0.359794
            ],
            [
              35.474854,
              -0.33508
            ],
            [
              35.48996,
              -0.293885
            ],
            [
              35.533905,
              -0.295257
            ],
            [
              35.57785,
              -0.302114
            ],
            [
              35.60257,
              -0.274661
            ],
            [
              35.625916,
              -0.287017
            ],
            [
              35.638275,
              -0.273285
            ],
            [
              35.64497,
              -0.272769
            ],
            [
              35.65012,
              -0.268992
            ],
            [
              35.65321,
              -0.260409
            ],
            [
              35.653553,
              -0.250283
            ],
            [
              35.659561,
              -0.244103
            ],
            [
              35.651665,
              -0.235521
            ],
            [
              35.652866,
              -0.226595
            ],
            [
              35.656643,
              -0.213719
            ],
            [
              35.652351,
              -0.210801
            ],
            [
              35.649433,
              -0.205993
            ],
            [
              35.659561,
              -0.199813
            ],
            [
              35.660248,
              -0.193977
            ],
            [
              35.652008,
              -0.194325
            ],
            [
              35.649261,
              -0.178534
            ],
            [
              35.634155,
              -0.173722
            ],
            [
              35.613556,
              -0.2005
            ],
            [
              35.612869,
              -0.221783
            ],
            [
              35.590897,
              -0.22247
            ],
            [
              35.568237,
              -0.229335
            ],
            [
              35.553818,
              -0.227278
            ],
            [
              35.53442,
              -0.252169
            ],
            [
              35.524979,
              -0.273283
            ],
            [
              35.505409,
              -0.272254
            ],
            [
              35.472965,
              -0.278607
            ],
            [
              35.458202,
              -0.286502
            ],
            [
              35.444813,
              -0.293883
            ],
            [
              35.423012,
              -0.298861
            ],
            [
              35.414257,
              -0.304182
            ],
            [
              35.408421,
              -0.310876
            ],
            [
              35.403271,
              -0.306243
            ],
            [
              35.366192,
              -0.348477
            ],
            [
              35.372028,
              -0.36203
            ],
            [
              35.383701,
              -0.359456
            ],
            [
              35.396061,
              -0.352762
            ],
            [
              35.395718,
              -0.36306
            ],
            [
              35.399666,
              -0.363576
            ],
            [
              35.391941,
              -0.368039
            ],
            [
              35.384731,
              -0.372845
            ],
            [
              35.38353,
              -0.376106
            ],
            [
              35.360012,
              -0.37027
            ],
            [
              35.349197,
              -0.376107
            ],
            [
              35.338898,
              -0.378683
            ],
            [
              35.336151,
              -0.394129
            ],
            [
              35.321388,
              -0.41164
            ],
            [
              35.318298,
              -0.41885
            ],
            [
              35.311432,
              -0.423313
            ],
            [
              35.314178,
              -0.435502
            ],
            [
              35.285854,
              -0.489223
            ],
            [
              35.292549,
              -0.490603
            ],
            [
              35.310059,
              -0.50124
            ],
            [
              35.311604,
              -0.509999
            ],
            [
              35.315552,
              -0.512402
            ],
            [
              35.311604,
              -0.518238
            ],
            [
              35.3092,
              -0.520813
            ],
            [
              35.306969,
              -0.529396
            ],
            [
              35.305767,
              -0.53815
            ],
            [
              35.326366,
              -0.570073
            ],
            [
              35.337353,
              -0.579174
            ],
            [
              35.350399,
              -0.551196
            ],
            [
              35.360184,
              -0.529912
            ],
            [
              35.367393,
              -0.521844
            ],
            [
              35.379925,
              -0.519798
            ],
            [
              35.381813,
              -0.525791
            ],
            [
              35.37838,
              -0.528537
            ],
            [
              35.375805,
              -0.530598
            ],
            [
              35.379581,
              -0.533002
            ],
            [
              35.383358,
              -0.54124
            ],
            [
              35.386276,
              -0.551025
            ],
            [
              35.390396,
              -0.558062
            ],
            [
              35.392456,
              -0.565959
            ],
            [
              35.391941,
              -0.585698
            ],
            [
              35.400867,
              -0.59514
            ],
            [
              35.408421,
              -0.607156
            ],
            [
              35.391769,
              -0.627581
            ],
            [
              35.396233,
              -0.636679
            ],
            [
              35.398464,
              -0.648179
            ],
            [
              35.426788,
              -0.720961
            ],
            [
              35.47863,
              -0.762152
            ],
            [
              35.506096,
              -0.774169
            ],
            [
              35.519142,
              -0.774856
            ],
            [
              35.538025,
              -0.779429
            ],
            [
              35.550041,
              -0.787557
            ],
            [
              35.570297,
              -0.767993
            ],
            [
              35.617676,
              -0.722684
            ],
            [
              35.639305,
              -0.741559
            ],
            [
              35.69149,
              -0.728517
            ],
            [
              35.69767,
              -0.758035
            ],
            [
              35.724792,
              -0.75735
            ],
            [
              35.733032,
              -0.786871
            ],
            [
              35.750885,
              -0.813649
            ],
            [
              35.752945,
              -0.831498
            ],
            [
              35.741272,
              -0.841797
            ],
            [
              35.730286,
              -0.865823
            ],
            [
              35.730972,
              -0.899462
            ],
            [
              35.702133,
              -0.926931
            ],
            [
              35.673981,
              -0.942732
            ],
            [
              35.612869,
              -0.98185
            ],
            [
              35.548325,
              -0.980478
            ],
            [
              35.46524,
              -0.933798
            ],
            [
              35.378723,
              -0.992835
            ],
            [
              35.332031,
              -1.002447
            ],
            [
              35.271606,
              -1.018211
            ],
            [
              35.241851,
              -1.036551
            ],
            [
              35.216675,
              -1.018211
            ],
            [
              35.189552,
              -1.029219
            ],
            [
              35.164833,
              -1.030595
            ],
            [
              35.131187,
              -1.028869
            ],
            [
              35.115051,
              -1.069716
            ],
            [
              35.089302,
              -1.058057
            ],
            [
              35.076942,
              -1.021676
            ],
            [
              35.062866,
              -0.998677
            ],
            [
              35.059776,
              -0.981858
            ],
            [
              35.037804,
              -0.983569
            ],
            [
              35.014458,
              -0.954385
            ],
            [
              34.990768,
              -0.964347
            ],
            [
              34.884682,
              -1.01376
            ],
            [
              34.851723,
              -0.987002
            ],
            [
              34.830437,
              -0.968809
            ],
            [
              34.833183,
              -0.950617
            ],
            [
              34.842796,
              -0.934482
            ],
            [
              35.006905,
              -0.891576
            ],
            [
              35.015792,
              -0.892985
            ],
            [
              35.007935,
              -0.883726
            ],
            [
              35.073853,
              -0.823344
            ],
            [
              35.087585,
              -0.776684
            ],
            [
              35.06012,
              -0.719045
            ],
            [
              35.054626,
              -0.650425
            ],
            [
              35.057373,
              -0.58455
            ],
            [
              35.05188,
              -0.488481
            ],
            [
              35.032654,
              -0.430838
            ],
            [
              34.996948,
              -0.406134
            ],
            [
              35.010681,
              -0.345746
            ],
            [
              35.038147,
              -0.307318
            ],
            [
              35.06012,
              -0.233204
            ],
            [
              35.101318,
              -0.18654
            ],
            [
              35.134277,
              -0.159091
            ],
            [
              35.157623,
              -0.167545
            ],
            [
              35.186462,
              -0.163421
            ],
            [
              35.203972,
              -0.164105
            ],
            [
              35.215302,
              -0.176485
            ],
            [
              35.244141,
              -0.18265
            ],
            [
              35.272636,
              -0.177856
            ],
            [
              35.283279,
              -0.151062
            ],
            [
              35.27813,
              -0.147283
            ],
            [
              35.270233,
              -0.153818
            ],
            [
              35.253067,
              -0.119468
            ],
            [
              35.234184,
              -0.119128
            ],
            [
              35.225601,
              -0.105391
            ],
            [
              35.228004,
              -0.074159
            ],
            [
              35.223541,
              -0.046343
            ],
            [
              35.222855,
              -0.038448
            ],
            [
              35.205002,
              -0.030211
            ],
            [
              35.183716,
              -0.026087
            ],
            [
              35.167236,
              -0.033647
            ],
            [
              35.156937,
              -0.03708
            ],
            [
              35.150757,
              -0.034338
            ],
            [
              34.985275,
              -0.023344
            ],
            [
              34.804688,
              -0.023345
            ],
            [
              34.829407,
              0.02196
            ],
            [
              34.852753,
              0.061794
            ],
            [
              34.865112,
              0.118096
            ],
            [
              34.895325,
              0.15653
            ],
            [
              34.922791,
              0.151024
            ],
            [
              34.922791,
              0.177132
            ],
            [
              34.929657,
              0.200483
            ],
            [
              34.946136,
              0.201851
            ],
            [
              34.962616,
              0.232079
            ],
            [
              34.981842,
              0.241689
            ],
            [
              34.953003,
              0.287184
            ],
            [
              34.93103,
              0.3515
            ],
            [
              34.946136,
              0.355679
            ],
            [
              34.957123,
              0.36461
            ],
            [
              34.958496,
              0.384516
            ],
            [
              34.957809,
              0.398937
            ],
            [
              34.956436,
              0.417478
            ],
            [
              34.934464,
              0.461425
            ],
            [
              34.909058,
              0.490238
            ],
            [
              34.906998,
              0.506732
            ],
            [
              34.882965,
              0.521154
            ],
            [
              34.854813,
              0.545864
            ],
            [
              34.895325,
              0.602182
            ],
            [
              34.921417,
              0.588428
            ],
            [
              35.001755,
              0.633756
            ],
            [
              35.026817,
              0.610746
            ],
            [
              35.034714,
              0.622431
            ],
            [
              35.039177,
              0.637197
            ],
            [
              35.082779,
              0.627572
            ],
            [
              35.095825,
              0.634447
            ],
            [
              35.105095,
              0.644404
            ],
            [
              35.115395,
              0.638561
            ],
            [
              35.119858,
              0.64921
            ],
            [
              35.14286,
              0.659512
            ],
            [
              35.157623,
              0.659509
            ],
            [
              35.142517,
              0.79921
            ],
            [
              35.098572,
              0.873362
            ],
            [
              35.057373,
              0.876091
            ],
            [
              35.257874,
              0.920017
            ],
            [
              35.321045,
              0.914286
            ],
            [
              35.175476,
              1.178244
            ],
            [
              35.071106,
              1.191912
            ],
            [
              35.027161,
              1.257845
            ],
            [
              34.933777,
              1.252333
            ],
            [
              34.895325,
              1.277061
            ],
            [
              34.8349,
              1.279709
            ],
            [
              34.682465,
              1.211162
            ],
            [
              34.568481,
              1.108024
            ],
            [
              34.532776,
              1.10807
            ],
            [
              34.52179,
              1.15073
            ],
            [
              34.536209,
              1.183666
            ],
            [
              34.319229,
              1.313762
            ],
            [
              34.312706,
              1.324078
            ],
            [
              34.308586,
              1.333333
            ],
            [
              34.30378,
              1.345347
            ],
            [
              34.312019,
              1.363894
            ],
            [
              34.321632,
              1.378655
            ],
            [
              34.318199,
              1.382767
            ],
            [
              34.325066,
              1.393754
            ],
            [
              34.330215,
              1.389975
            ],
            [
              34.336052,
              1.394439
            ],
            [
              34.341202,
              1.399247
            ],
            [
              34.351158,
              1.399237
            ],
            [
              34.348412,
              1.407819
            ],
            [
              34.355278,
              1.413655
            ],
            [
              34.363174,
              1.41537
            ],
            [
              34.361801,
              1.421894
            ],
            [
              34.360085,
              1.427387
            ],
            [
              34.370384,
              1.434253
            ],
            [
              34.375877,
              1.44318
            ],
            [
              34.38343,
              1.445234
            ],
            [
              34.39064,
              1.451075
            ],
            [
              34.39682,
              1.439057
            ],
            [
              34.404716,
              1.452096
            ],
            [
              34.431839,
              1.445224
            ],
            [
              34.424629,
              1.465486
            ],
            [
              34.431839,
              1.467202
            ],
            [
              34.436646,
              1.464451
            ],
            [
              34.444885,
              1.465138
            ],
            [
              34.444885,
              1.474066
            ],
            [
              34.447975,
              1.479912
            ],
            [
              34.440079,
              1.497404
            ],
            [
              34.441452,
              1.511134
            ],
            [
              34.426346,
              1.532415
            ],
            [
              34.389267,
              1.565356
            ],
            [
              34.422913,
              1.555732
            ],
            [
              34.434586,
              1.57359
            ],
            [
              34.447117,
              1.575137
            ],
            [
              34.45364,
              1.57445
            ],
            [
              34.457417,
              1.577369
            ],
            [
              34.459648,
              1.580628
            ],
            [
              34.464283,
              1.583545
            ],
            [
              34.465313,
              1.587837
            ],
            [
              34.474411,
              1.590066
            ],
            [
              34.485912,
              1.588518
            ],
            [
              34.486771,
              1.599849
            ],
            [
              34.49295,
              1.605183
            ],
            [
              34.496899,
              1.604482
            ],
            [
              34.499302,
              1.598129
            ],
            [
              34.512348,
              1.598474
            ],
            [
              34.515953,
              1.598989
            ],
            [
              34.517498,
              1.602079
            ],
            [
              34.521961,
              1.60225
            ],
            [
              34.535694,
              1.60019
            ],
            [
              34.543419,
              1.60088
            ],
            [
              34.548912,
              1.595901
            ],
            [
              34.555779,
              1.592124
            ],
            [
              34.563332,
              1.590065
            ],
            [
              34.567451,
              1.584059
            ],
            [
              34.57655,
              1.582172
            ],
            [
              34.583759,
              1.587666
            ],
            [
              34.592514,
              1.585973
            ],
            [
              34.594574,
              1.579255
            ],
            [
              34.600754,
              1.578053
            ],
            [
              34.60762,
              1.578226
            ],
            [
              34.612942,
              1.576338
            ],
            [
              34.617405,
              1.578743
            ],
            [
              34.621353,
              1.574808
            ],
            [
              34.627361,
              1.55214
            ],
            [
              34.637146,
              1.543047
            ],
            [
              34.644356,
              1.543967
            ],
            [
              34.648647,
              1.539789
            ],
            [
              34.654312,
              1.5367
            ],
            [
              34.658947,
              1.52812
            ],
            [
              34.66341,
              1.523829
            ],
            [
              34.670105,
              1.524514
            ],
            [
              34.670448,
              1.528464
            ],
            [
              34.675941,
              1.527089
            ],
            [
              34.677486,
              1.53018
            ],
            [
              34.680405,
              1.530352
            ],
            [
              34.684868,
              1.527433
            ],
            [
              34.694481,
              1.528121
            ],
            [
              34.699116,
              1.526583
            ],
            [
              34.726753,
              1.47097
            ],
            [
              34.721603,
              1.455189
            ],
            [
              34.7192,
              1.447638
            ],
            [
              34.722633,
              1.438704
            ],
            [
              34.73053,
              1.438727
            ],
            [
              34.756279,
              1.407821
            ],
            [
              34.777908,
              1.392352
            ],
            [
              34.777565,
              1.381742
            ],
            [
              34.782715,
              1.377624
            ],
            [
              34.782715,
              1.37007
            ],
            [
              34.786835,
              1.364829
            ],
            [
              34.805717,
              1.383759
            ],
            [
              34.803314,
              1.399588
            ],
            [
              34.797821,
              1.406109
            ],
            [
              34.794731,
              1.410914
            ],
            [
              34.794388,
              1.41363
            ],
            [
              34.803658,
              1.426361
            ],
            [
              34.81636,
              1.430792
            ],
            [
              34.82872,
              1.449674
            ],
            [
              34.843483,
              1.455163
            ],
            [
              34.864769,
              1.528304
            ],
            [
              34.893265,
              1.558151
            ],
            [
              34.906311,
              1.551573
            ],
            [
              34.944763,
              1.576298
            ],
            [
              34.990768,
              1.662133
            ],
            [
              35.000381,
              1.754789
            ],
            [
              35.002441,
              1.957799
            ],
            [
              34.977722,
              1.985209
            ],
            [
              34.914551,
              2.427308
            ],
            [
              34.946823,
              2.451958
            ],
            [
              34.983902,
              2.436164
            ],
            [
              35.027847,
              2.431362
            ],
            [
              35.022354,
              2.45606
            ],
            [
              35.016861,
              2.501318
            ],
            [
              35.059433,
              2.565129
            ],
            [
              35.057373,
              2.593251
            ],
            [
              35.064926,
              2.617264
            ],
            [
              35.093079,
              2.638533
            ],
            [
              35.115051,
              2.649843
            ],
            [
              35.130501,
              2.644366
            ],
            [
              35.159683,
              2.625848
            ],
            [
              35.178223,
              2.59669
            ],
            [
              35.184402,
              2.583315
            ],
            [
              35.188866,
              2.568549
            ],
            [
              35.212898,
              2.541126
            ],
            [
              35.215988,
              2.524323
            ],
            [
              35.215988,
              2.500647
            ],
            [
              35.219421,
              2.487269
            ],
            [
              35.221825,
              2.465996
            ],
            [
              35.223541,
              2.455035
            ],
            [
              35.231781,
              2.447143
            ],
            [
              35.246887,
              2.441315
            ],
            [
              35.252724,
              2.437541
            ],
            [
              35.27401,
              2.434453
            ],
            [
              35.297356,
              2.423138
            ],
            [
              35.303535,
              2.397766
            ],
            [
              35.307312,
              2.369286
            ],
            [
              35.307655,
              2.322614
            ],
            [
              35.312119,
              2.278025
            ],
            [
              35.352974,
              2.13017
            ],
            [
              35.393829,
              1.966092
            ],
            [
              35.390739,
              1.957588
            ],
            [
              35.392456,
              1.951067
            ],
            [
              35.378723,
              1.94489
            ],
            [
              35.37632,
              1.935967
            ],
            [
              35.3722,
              1.926019
            ],
            [
              35.453568,
              1.847787
            ],
            [
              35.466957,
              1.843328
            ],
            [
              35.476913,
              1.828571
            ],
            [
              35.473824,
              1.804205
            ],
            [
              35.48275,
              1.79426
            ],
            [
              35.492706,
              1.779491
            ],
            [
              35.497169,
              1.773322
            ],
            [
              35.496826,
              1.767829
            ],
            [
              35.502663,
              1.764722
            ],
            [
              35.519485,
              1.76852
            ],
            [
              35.531845,
              1.761996
            ],
            [
              35.550385,
              1.763374
            ],
            [
              35.568924,
              1.757191
            ],
            [
              35.576477,
              1.761313
            ],
            [
              35.58403,
              1.759252
            ],
            [
              35.595016,
              1.762351
            ],
            [
              35.609436,
              1.749299
            ],
            [
              35.635529,
              1.744839
            ],
            [
              35.669861,
              1.72941
            ],
            [
              35.675697,
              1.720474
            ],
            [
              35.683594,
              1.71464
            ],
            [
              35.70385,
              1.703314
            ],
            [
              35.723763,
              1.687185
            ],
            [
              35.740242,
              1.676891
            ],
            [
              35.758095,
              1.671402
            ],
            [
              35.773201,
              1.664538
            ],
            [
              35.786591,
              1.657348
            ],
            [
              35.786676,
              1.654585
            ],
            [
              35.782323,
              1.654415
            ],
            [
              35.782321,
              1.654415
            ],
            [
              35.782321,
              1.654415
            ],
            [
              35.782321,
              1.654415
            ],
            [
              35.78232,
              1.654415
            ],
            [
              35.78232,
              1.654415
            ],
            [
              35.78232,
              1.654415
            ],
            [
              35.782319,
              1.654415
            ],
            [
              35.782319,
              1.654415
            ],
            [
              35.782319,
              1.654415
            ],
            [
              35.782319,
              1.654415
            ],
            [
              35.782319,
              1.654415
            ],
            [
              35.782319,
              1.654415
            ],
            [
              35.782319,
              1.654415
            ],
            [
              35.782319,
              1.654415
            ],
            [
              35.782319,
              1.654415
            ],
            [
              35.782319,
              1.654415
            ],
            [
              35.782319,
              1.654415
            ],
            [
              35.78232,
              1.654414
            ],
            [
              35.78232,
              1.654414
            ],
            [
              35.78232,
              1.654415
            ],
            [
              35.782319,
              1.654415
            ],
            [
              35.782319,
              1.654415
            ],
            [
              35.782319,
              1.654415
            ],
            [
              35.782319,
              1.654415
            ],
            [
              35.782319,
              1.654415
            ],
            [
              35.782319,
              1.654415
            ],
            [
              35.782319,
              1.654415
            ],
            [
              35.782319,
              1.654415
            ],
            [
              35.782319,
              1.654415
            ],
            [
              35.782319,
              1.654415
            ],
            [
              35.782319,
              1.654415
            ],
            [
              35.782319,
              1.654415
            ],
            [
              35.782319,
              1.654415
            ],
            [
              35.782319,
              1.654415
            ],
            [
              35.782319,
              1.654415
            ],
            [
              35.782319,
              1.654415
            ],
            [
              35.782319,
              1.654415
            ],
            [
              35.782319,
              1.654415
            ],
            [
              35.782319,
              1.654415
            ],
            [
              35.782319,
              1.654415
            ],
            [
              35.782319,
              1.654415
            ],
            [
              35.782319,
              1.654415
            ],
            [
              35.782319,
              1.654415
            ],
            [
              35.782319,
              1.654415
            ],
            [
              35.782319,
              1.654415
            ],
            [
              35.782319,
              1.654415
            ],
            [
              35.782319,
              1.654415
            ],
            [
              35.782318,
              1.654415
            ],
            [
              35.782317,
              1.654415
            ],
            [
              35.782317,
              1.654415
            ],
            [
              35.782317,
              1.654415
            ],
            [
              35.782317,
              1.654415
            ],
            [
              35.782317,
              1.654415
            ],
            [
              35.782317,
              1.654415
            ],
            [
              35.782317,
              1.654415
            ],
            [
              35.782317,
              1.654415
            ],
            [
              35.782316,
              1.654415
            ],
            [
              35.782316,
              1.654415
            ],
            [
              35.782316,
              1.654415
            ],
            [
              35.782316,
              1.654415
            ],
            [
              35.782316,
              1.654415
            ],
            [
              35.782316,
              1.654415
            ],
            [
              35.782316,
              1.654415
            ],
            [
              35.782316,
              1.654415
            ],
            [
              35.782316,
              1.654415
            ],
            [
              35.782316,
              1.654415
            ],
            [
              35.782308,
              1.654414
            ],
            [
              35.782303,
              1.654414
            ],
            [
              35.782301,
              1.654414
            ],
            [
              35.7823,
              1.654414
            ],
            [
              35.7823,
              1.654414
            ],
            [
              35.782299,
              1.654414
            ],
            [
              35.782299,
              1.654414
            ],
            [
              35.782299,
              1.654414
            ],
            [
              35.782299,
              1.654414
            ],
            [
              35.782299,
              1.654414
            ],
            [
              35.782299,
              1.654414
            ],
            [
              35.782299,
              1.654414
            ],
            [
              35.782299,
              1.654414
            ],
            [
              35.782299,
              1.654414
            ],
            [
              35.782299,
              1.654414
            ],
            [
              35.782299,
              1.654414
            ],
            [
              35.782299,
              1.654414
            ],
            [
              35.782299,
              1.654414
            ],
            [
              35.782299,
              1.654414
            ],
            [
              35.782299,
              1.654414
            ],
            [
              35.782299,
              1.654414
            ],
            [
              35.782299,
              1.654414
            ],
            [
              35.782299,
              1.654414
            ],
            [
              35.782299,
              1.654414
            ],
            [
              35.782299,
              1.654414
            ],
            [
              35.782299,
              1.654414
            ],
            [
              35.782299,
              1.654414
            ],
            [
              35.782299,
              1.654414
            ],
            [
              35.782299,
              1.654414
            ],
            [
              35.782299,
              1.654414
            ],
            [
              35.782299,
              1.654414
            ],
            [
              35.782299,
              1.654414
            ],
            [
              35.782299,
              1.654414
            ],
            [
              35.782299,
              1.654414
            ],
            [
              35.782299,
              1.654414
            ],
            [
              35.782299,
              1.654414
            ],
            [
              35.782299,
              1.654414
            ],
            [
              35.782299,
              1.654414
            ],
            [
              35.782299,
              1.654414
            ],
            [
              35.782299,
              1.654414
            ],
            [
              35.782299,
              1.654414
            ],
            [
              35.782299,
              1.654414
            ],
            [
              35.782299,
              1.654414
            ],
            [
              35.782299,
              1.654414
            ],
            [
              35.782299,
              1.654414
            ],
            [
              35.782299,
              1.654414
            ],
            [
              35.782299,
              1.654414
            ],
            [
              35.782299,
              1.654414
            ],
            [
              35.782299,
              1.654414
            ],
            [
              35.782299,
              1.654414
            ],
            [
              35.782299,
              1.654414
            ],
            [
              35.782299,
              1.654414
            ],
            [
              35.782299,
              1.654414
            ],
            [
              35.782299,
              1.654414
            ],
            [
              35.782299,
              1.654414
            ],
            [
              35.782299,
              1.654414
            ],
            [
              35.782299,
              1.654414
            ],
            [
              35.782299,
              1.654414
            ],
            [
              35.782299,
              1.654414
            ],
            [
              35.782299,
              1.654414
            ],
            [
              35.782299,
              1.654414
            ],
            [
              35.782299,
              1.654414
            ],
            [
              35.782299,
              1.654414
            ],
            [
              35.782299,
              1.654414
            ],
            [
              35.782299,
              1.654414
            ],
            [
              35.782299,
              1.654414
            ],
            [
              35.782299,
              1.654414
            ],
            [
              35.782299,
              1.654414
            ],
            [
              35.782299,
              1.654414
            ],
            [
              35.782299,
              1.654414
            ],
            [
              35.782299,
              1.654414
            ],
            [
              35.782299,
              1.654414
            ],
            [
              35.782299,
              1.654414
            ],
            [
              35.782299,
              1.654414
            ],
            [
              35.782299,
              1.654414
            ],
            [
              35.782299,
              1.654414
            ],
            [
              35.782299,
              1.654414
            ],
            [
              35.782299,
              1.654414
            ],
            [
              35.782299,
              1.654414
            ],
            [
              35.782299,
              1.654414
            ],
            [
              35.782299,
              1.654414
            ],
            [
              35.782299,
              1.654414
            ],
            [
              35.782299,
              1.654414
            ],
            [
              35.782299,
              1.654414
            ],
            [
              35.782299,
              1.654414
            ],
            [
              35.782299,
              1.654414
            ],
            [
              35.782299,
              1.654414
            ],
            [
              35.782299,
              1.654414
            ],
            [
              35.782299,
              1.654414
            ],
            [
              35.782299,
              1.654414
            ],
            [
              35.782299,
              1.654414
            ],
            [
              35.782299,
              1.654414
            ],
            [
              35.782299,
              1.654414
            ],
            [
              35.782299,
              1.654414
            ],
            [
              35.782299,
              1.654414
            ],
            [
              35.782299,
              1.654414
            ],
            [
              35.782299,
              1.654414
            ],
            [
              35.782299,
              1.654414
            ],
            [
              35.782299,
              1.654414
            ],
            [
              35.782299,
              1.654414
            ],
            [
              35.782299,
              1.654414
            ],
            [
              35.782299,
              1.654414
            ],
            [
              35.782299,
              1.654414
            ],
            [
              35.782299,
              1.654414
            ],
            [
              35.782299,
              1.654414
            ],
            [
              35.782299,
              1.654414
            ],
            [
              35.782299,
              1.654414
            ],
            [
              35.782299,
              1.654414
            ],
            [
              35.782299,
              1.654414
            ],
            [
              35.782299,
              1.654414
            ],
            [
              35.782299,
              1.654414
            ],
            [
              35.782299,
              1.654414
            ],
            [
              35.782299,
              1.654414
            ],
            [
              35.782299,
              1.654414
            ],
            [
              35.782299,
              1.654414
            ],
            [
              35.782299,
              1.654414
            ],
            [
              35.782299,
              1.654414
            ],
            [
              35.782299,
              1.654414
            ],
            [
              35.782299,
              1.654414
            ],
            [
              35.782299,
              1.654414
            ],
            [
              35.782299,
              1.654414
            ],
            [
              35.782299,
              1.654414
            ],
            [
              35.782299,
              1.654414
            ],
            [
              35.782299,
              1.654414
            ],
            [
              35.782299,
              1.654414
            ],
            [
              35.782299,
              1.654414
            ],
            [
              35.782299,
              1.654414
            ],
            [
              35.782299,
              1.654414
            ],
            [
              35.782299,
              1.654414
            ],
            [
              35.782299,
              1.654414
            ],
            [
              35.782299,
              1.654414
            ],
            [
              35.782299,
              1.654414
            ],
            [
              35.782299,
              1.654414
            ],
            [
              35.782299,
              1.654414
            ],
            [
              35.782299,
              1.654414
            ],
            [
              35.782299,
              1.654414
            ],
            [
              35.782299,
              1.654414
            ],
            [
              35.782299,
              1.654414
            ],
            [
              35.782299,
              1.654414
            ],
            [
              35.782299,
              1.654414
            ],
            [
              35.782299,
              1.654414
            ],
            [
              35.782299,
              1.654414
            ],
            [
              35.782299,
              1.654414
            ],
            [
              35.782299,
              1.654414
            ],
            [
              35.782299,
              1.654414
            ],
            [
              35.782299,
              1.654414
            ],
            [
              35.782299,
              1.654414
            ],
            [
              35.782299,
              1.654414
            ],
            [
              35.782299,
              1.654414
            ],
            [
              35.782299,
              1.654414
            ],
            [
              35.782299,
              1.654414
            ],
            [
              35.782299,
              1.654414
            ],
            [
              35.782299,
              1.654414
            ],
            [
              35.782299,
              1.654414
            ],
            [
              35.782299,
              1.654414
            ],
            [
              35.782299,
              1.654414
            ],
            [
              35.782299,
              1.654414
            ],
            [
              35.782299,
              1.654414
            ],
            [
              35.782299,
              1.654414
            ],
            [
              35.782299,
              1.654414
            ],
            [
              35.782299,
              1.654414
            ],
            [
              35.782299,
              1.654414
            ],
            [
              35.782299,
              1.654414
            ],
            [
              35.782299,
              1.654414
            ],
            [
              35.782299,
              1.654414
            ],
            [
              35.782299,
              1.654414
            ],
            [
              35.782299,
              1.654414
            ],
            [
              35.782299,
              1.654414
            ],
            [
              35.782299,
              1.654414
            ],
            [
              35.782299,
              1.654414
            ],
            [
              35.782299,
              1.654414
            ],
            [
              35.782299,
              1.654414
            ],
            [
              35.782299,
              1.654414
            ],
            [
              35.782299,
              1.654414
            ],
            [
              35.782299,
              1.654414
            ],
            [
              35.782299,
              1.654414
            ],
            [
              35.782299,
              1.654414
            ],
            [
              35.782299,
              1.654414
            ],
            [
              35.782299,
              1.654414
            ],
            [
              35.782299,
              1.654414
            ],
            [
              35.782299,
              1.654414
            ],
            [
              35.782299,
              1.654414
            ],
            [
              35.782299,
              1.654414
            ],
            [
              35.782299,
              1.654414
            ],
            [
              35.782299,
              1.654414
            ],
            [
              35.782299,
              1.654414
            ],
            [
              35.782299,
              1.654414
            ],
            [
              35.782299,
              1.654414
            ],
            [
              35.782299,
              1.654414
            ],
            [
              35.782299,
              1.654414
            ],
            [
              35.782299,
              1.654414
            ],
            [
              35.782299,
              1.654414
            ],
            [
              35.782299,
              1.654414
            ],
            [
              35.782299,
              1.654414
            ],
            [
              35.782299,
              1.654414
            ],
            [
              35.782299,
              1.654414
            ],
            [
              35.782299,
              1.654414
            ],
            [
              35.782299,
              1.654414
            ],
            [
              35.782299,
              1.654414
            ],
            [
              35.782299,
              1.654414
            ],
            [
              36.099014,
              1.165116
            ],
            [
              36.173859,
              1.168634
            ],
            [
              36.316681,
              0.990083
            ],
            [
              36.394444,
              0.911654
            ],
            [
              36.395988,
              0.903071
            ],
            [
              36.40543,
              0.898953
            ],
            [
              36.41367,
              0.898782
            ],
            [
              36.418476,
              0.899984
            ],
            [
              36.423111,
              0.898791
            ],
            [
              36.427746,
              0.885395
            ],
            [
              36.437702,
              0.876983
            ],
            [
              36.44783,
              0.869939
            ],
            [
              36.456928,
              0.871146
            ],
            [
              36.461906,
              0.867544
            ],
            [
              36.465511,
              0.863422
            ],
            [
              36.471004,
              0.862052
            ],
            [
              36.474438,
              0.857073
            ],
            [
              36.479931,
              0.853467
            ],
            [
              36.485939,
              0.85038
            ],
            [
              36.489544,
              0.846258
            ],
            [
              36.477356,
              0.838367
            ],
            [
              36.46843,
              0.819848
            ],
            [
              36.405258,
              0.715446
            ],
            [
              36.348267,
              0.659807
            ],
            [
              36.291275,
              0.644011
            ],
            [
              36.278915,
              0.626167
            ],
            [
              36.294022,
              0.561697
            ],
            [
              36.228104,
              0.418131
            ],
            [
              36.229477,
              0.39684
            ],
            [
              36.259003,
              0.374864
            ],
            [
              36.263123,
              0.34464
            ],
            [
              36.25145,
              0.329524
            ],
            [
              36.24733,
              0.339144
            ],
            [
              36.231537,
              0.33159
            ],
            [
              36.227417,
              0.318578
            ],
            [
              36.240463,
              0.315859
            ],
            [
              36.25351,
              0.298003
            ],
            [
              36.262436,
              0.278082
            ],
            [
              36.281662,
              0.269842
            ],
            [
              36.279602,
              0.25474
            ],
            [
              36.293335,
              0.251322
            ],
            [
              36.297455,
              0.2314
            ],
            [
              36.292648,
              0.207344
            ],
            [
              36.257629,
              0.181929
            ],
            [
              36.269989,
              0.164237
            ],
            [
              36.356506,
              0.157934
            ],
            [
              36.401825,
              0.129786
            ],
            [
              36.364746,
              0.052169
            ],
            [
              36.300888,
              0.054915
            ],
            [
              36.256256,
              0.032273
            ],
            [
              36.22879,
              0.008216
            ],
            [
              36.170425,
              -0.057714
            ],
            [
              36.129227,
              -0.14561
            ],
            [
              36.073608,
              -0.122934
            ],
            [
              36.059189,
              -0.138019
            ],
            [
              36.002197,
              -0.138734
            ],
            [
              35.956192,
              -0.1449
            ],
            [
              35.936279,
              -0.124968
            ],
            [
              35.890274,
              -0.157929
            ],
            [
              35.860748,
              -0.21289
            ],
            [
              35.831223,
              -0.211515
            ],
            [
              35.811996,
              -0.215637
            ],
            [
              35.79071,
              -0.217008
            ],
            [
              35.764618,
              -0.225942
            ],
            [
              35.746078,
              -0.218383
            ],
            [
              35.717239,
              -0.223164
            ],
            [
              35.69252,
              -0.210122
            ],
            [
              35.675354,
              -0.207377
            ],
            [
              35.671234,
              -0.16343
            ],
            [
              35.658102,
              -0.217408
            ],
            [
              35.657501,
              -0.229681
            ],
            [
              35.665226,
              -0.228737
            ],
            [
              35.680761,
              -0.232342
            ],
            [
              35.690975,
              -0.235347
            ],
            [
              35.703678,
              -0.237064
            ],
            [
              35.717239,
              -0.246075
            ],
            [
              35.713806,
              -0.244275
            ],
            [
              35.71166,
              -0.246162
            ],
            [
              35.71106,
              -0.2429
            ],
            [
              35.709085,
              -0.242043
            ],
            [
              35.697069,
              -0.248565
            ],
            [
              35.699301,
              -0.254229
            ],
            [
              35.70179,
              -0.252942
            ],
            [
              35.701962,
              -0.258092
            ],
            [
              35.709257,
              -0.26693
            ],
            [
              35.663509,
              -0.313959
            ],
            [
              35.636902,
              -0.31791
            ],
            [
              35.631409,
              -0.331988
            ],
            [
              35.609093,
              -0.344684
            ],
            [
              35.592785,
              -0.371987
            ]
          ]
        ]
      }
    },
    {
      "type": "Feature",
      "properties": {},
      "geometry": {
        "type": "Polygon",
        "coordinates": [
          [
            [
              34.850006,
              -1.283921
            ],
            [
              34.869232,
              -1.299023
            ],
            [
              34.896698,
              -1.336091
            ],
            [
              34.848633,
              -1.367667
            ],
            [
              34.779968,
              -1.41846
            ],
            [
              34.723663,
              -1.385514
            ],
            [
              34.723663,
              -1.363186
            ],
            [
              34.72229,
              -1.353921
            ],
            [
              34.720917,
              -1.345341
            ],
            [
              34.716797,
              -1.333674
            ],
            [
              34.713707,
              -1.321319
            ],
            [
              34.712334,
              -1.310681
            ],
            [
              34.709587,
              -1.302788
            ],
            [
              34.695511,
              -1.244112
            ],
            [
              34.755249,
              -1.271566
            ],
            [
              34.790268,
              -1.268132
            ],
            [
              34.823227,
              -1.273625
            ],
            [
              34.850006,
              -1.283921
            ]
          ]
        ]
      }
    }
  ]
}

Subdivisions
There are several ethnic groups within the Kalenjin: They include the Keiyo, Endorois, Kipsigis, Marakwet, Nandi, Pokot, Terik, Tugen, Sengwer (Cherengany) and Sabaot.

Economic activity
A significant majority of Kalenjin speakers are primarily subsistence farmers, they cultivate grains such as maize and wheat and, to a lesser extent, sorghum and millet or practice a pastoralist lifestyle; rearing beef, goats and sheep for meat production. Equally large numbers practice a combination of both farming and livestock (often dairy cattle) rearing. The counties of Uasin Gishu, Trans Nzoia and to a lesser extent Nakuru are often referred to as Kenya's grain-basket counties and are responsible for supplying much of the country's grain requirements.

Meat products from the northern areas of West Pokot and Baringo are particularly appreciated for their flavor and are favored in the Rift for the preparation of nyama choma.

A significant number of Kalenjin have moved to Kenya's cities where large numbers are employed in the Kenyan Government, the Army, Police Force, the banking and finance industry as well as in business.

Politics
Since independence, Kenyan politics have largely been dominated by the 'big' five tribes (including Kikuyu, Luhya, Kalenjin, Luo, and Kamba) which constitute about 72% of Kenya population. Kenya's first vice president and Kenya's second president was Daniel Toroitich Araap Moi who was Tugen.  Kenya's incumbent president, Dr. William Samoei Araap Ruto, is also Kalenjin, coming from the Nandi ethnicity.

In 2007 a disputed election in Kenya erupted into a two-month political crisis that led to the deaths of more than a thousand people and the displacement of almost seven hundred thousand. Much of the violence fell along ethnic lines, the principal perpetrators of which were the Kalenjin, who lashed out at other communities in the Rift Valley. What makes this episode remarkable compared to many other instances of ethnic violence is that the Kalenjin community is a recent construct: the group has only existed since the mid-twentieth century.

Culture
Contemporary Kalenjin culture is a product of its heritage, the suite of cultural adoptions of the British colonial period and modern Kenyan identity from which it borrows and adds to.

Language
The Kalenjin speak Kalenjin languages as mother tongues. The language grouping belongs to the Nilotic family. The majority of Kalenjin speakers are found in Kenya with smaller populations in Tanzania (e.g., Akie) and Uganda (e.g., Kupsabiny).

Kiswahili and English, both Kenyan national languages are widely spoken as second and third languages by most Kalenjin speakers and as first and second languages by some Kalenjin.

Names

Kalenjin names are primarily used by the Kalenjin people of Kenya and Kalenjin language-speaking communities such as the Sebei of Uganda and the Akie of Tanzania.

The Kalenjin traditionally had two primary names for the individual though in contemporary times a Christian or Arabic name is also given at birth such that most Kalenjin today have three names with the patronym Arap in some cases being acquired later in life e.g. Alfred Kirwa Yego and Daniel Toroitch arap Moi.

Customs

Initiation

The initiation process is a key component of Kalenjin identity. Among males, the circumcision (yatitaet) and initiation (tumdo) process is seen as signifying one's transition from boyhood to manhood and is taken very seriously. On the whole, the process still occurs during a boys pre-teen/early teenage years though significant differences are emerging in practice. Much esotericism is still attended to in the traditional practice of initiation and there was great uproar amongst Kalenjin elders in 2013 when aspects of the tradition were openly inquired into at the International Court. Conversely a number of contemporary Kalenjin have the circumcision process carried out in hospital as a standard surgical procedure and various models of the learning process have emerged to complement the modern practice. For orthodox, urban and Christian traditions the use of ibinwek is in decline and the date has been moved from the traditional September/October festive season to December to coincide with the Kenyan school calendar.

The female circumcision process is perceived negatively in the modern world (see: FGM) and various campaigns are being carried out with the intention of eradicating the practice among the Kalenjin. A notable anti-FGM crusader is Hon. Linah Jebii Kilimo.

Marriage
The contemporary Kalenjin wedding has fewer ceremonies than it did traditionally and they often, though not always, occur on different days;

During the first ceremony, the proposal/show-up (kaayaaet'ap koito), the young man who wants to marry, informs his parents of his intention and they in turn tell their relatives often as part of discussing suitability of the pairing. If they approve, they will go to the girls family for a show-up and to request for the girl's hand in marriage. The parents are usually accompanied by aunts, uncles or even grandparents and the request is often couched as an apology to the prospective brides parents for seeking to take their daughter away from them. If her family agrees to let them have their daughter, a date for a formal engagement is agreed upon. Other than initiating it, the intended groom and prospective bride play no part in this ceremony.

During the second ceremony, the formal engagement (koito), the bridegroom's family goes to the bride's home to officially meet her family. The groom's family which includes aunts, uncles, grandparents, etc. are invited into a room for extensive introductions and dowry negotiations. After the negotiations, a ceremony is held where the bridegroom and bride are given advice on family life by older relatives from both families. Usually, symbolic gifts and presents are given to the couple during this ceremony. The koito is usually quite colorful and sometimes bears resemblance to a wedding ceremony and it is indeed gaining prominence as the key event since the kaayaaet'ap koito is sometimes merged with it and at other times the tunisiet is foregone in favor of it.

The third ceremony, the wedding (tunisiet), is a big ceremony whereas many relations, neighbors, friends and business partners are invited. In modern iterations, this ceremony often follows the pattern of a regular Western wedding; it is usually held in church, where rings are exchanged, is officiated by a pastor and followed by a reception.

Religion

Almost all modern Kalenjin are members of an organised religion with the vast majority being Christian and a few identifying as Muslim.

Elders
The Kalenjin have a council of elders composed of members of the various Kalenjin clans and sub-clans and known as the Myoot Council of Elders. This council was formed in the Kenyan post-independence period.

Folklore

Like all oral societies, the Kalenjin developed a rich collection of folklore. Folk narratives were told to pass on a message and a number featured the Chemosit, known in Marakwet as Chebokeri, the dreaded monster that devoured the brains of disobedient children.

The Legend of Cheptalel is fairly common among the Kipsigis and Nandi and the name was adopted from Kalenjin mythology into modern tradition. The fall of the Long’ole Clan is another popular tale based on a true story and is told to warn against pride. In the story, the Long’ole warriors believing they were the mightiest in the land goaded their distant rivals the Maasai into battle. The Maasai, though at first reluctant eventually attacked wiping out the Long’ole clan.

As with other East African communities, the colonial period Misri myth has over time become popular among the Kalenjin and aspects of it have influenced the direction of folkloric and academic studies.

Arts & crafts

The use of arts and crafts form part of Kalenjin culture with decorative bead-work being the most highly developed visual art. The Kalenjin are generally not well known for their handicraft's however, though women do make and locally sell decorated calabashes made from gourds. These gourd calabashes known as sotet are rubbed with oil and adorned with small colored beads and are essentially the same type of calabashes that are used for storing mursik.

Radio, television, and film
Up until the early 21st century, vernacular radio and television stations were essentially banned in Kenya. The liberalization of the media sector in Kenya which began in the 1990s has seen the growth of Kalenjin language content across most modern mediums. This period has seen the establishment of Kalenjin language media companies such as Kass Media Group, a Kenyan radio and television company, as well as Kalenjin language stations within diverse media groups e.g. Chamgei FM (Royal Media Services) and Kitwek FM (Kenya Broadcasting Corporation). There has been a concurrent proliferation of Kalenjin music, television programs and more recently the premier of the first Kalenjin language film, Ngebe Gaa, at the 2019 Eldoret Film Festival.

Music
Contemporary Kalenjin music has long been influenced by the Kipsigis leading to Kericho's perception as a cultural innovation center. Musical innovation and regional styles, however, abound across all Kalenjin speaking areas. Popular musicians include Pastor Joel Kimetto (father of Kalenjin Gospel), Mike Rotich, Emmy Kosgei, Maggy Cheruiyot, Josphat Koech Karanja, Lilian Rotich and Barbra Chepkoech. Msupa S and Kipsang represent an emerging generation of Kalenjin pop musicians. Notable stars who have passed on include Diana Chemutai Musila (Chelele), Junior Kotestes and Weldon Cheruiyot (Kenene).

Literature
A number of writers have documented Kalenjin history and culture, notably B. E. Kipkorir, Paul Kipchumba, and Ciarunji Chesaina.

Cuisine

Ugali, known in Kalenjin as kimnyet, served with cooked vegetables such as isageek (African cabbage) or sochot (African nightshade), and milk form the staples of the Kalenjin diet. Less often ugali, rice or chapati, is served with roast meat, usually beef or goat, and occasionally chicken. The traditional ugali is made of millet and sorghum and is known as psong'iot. It is considered healthier than ugali made of maize flour (similar to brown bread/white bread) and has seen a resurgence in popularity in tandem with global trends towards healthier eating. The traditional snack moriot (somewhat similar to corn tortillas) is obtained from the crust after cooking ugali and is still quite enjoyed. Similarly, the traditional drink mursik, and honey, both considered delicacies (karise/kariseyuek) for a long time remain quite popular.

Extensive use is made of dairy produce in traditional recipes such as socheek (a vegetable relish made with greens, milk and cream) as well as contemporary meals such as Mcheleng (rice with milk – a creamy smooth dish made as a delicacy for children but usually enjoyed by the entire family) and Bean stew with milk and cream.

Combination dishes/mixtures while not considered traditionally Kalenjin are encountered in more cosmopolitan areas. The most common of these is kwankwaniek, a mixture of maize and beans boiled together (githeri).

Milk or tea may be drunk by adults and children with any meal or snack. Tea (chaiik) averages 40% milk by volume and is usually liberally sweetened. If no milk is available tea may be drunk black with sugar though taking tea without milk is considered genuine hardship.

In addition to bread, people routinely buy foodstuffs such as sugar, tea leaves, cooking fat, sodas, and other items that they do not produce themselves.

Health & science
Traditional Kalenjin knowledge was fairly comprehensive in the study and usage of plants for medicinal purposes and a significant trend among some contemporary Kalenjin scientists is the study of this aspect of traditional knowledge. In more recent times, commercial enterprises have started blending and packaging traditional herbal remedies for the urban Kenyan market. Most noted of these is Harriet's Botanicals which packages Arorwet and Tendwet alternative remedies and distributes them via a number of shops spread across the country.  

One of the more notable Kalenjin scientists is Prof Richard Mibey whose work on the Tami dye helped revive the textile industry in Eldoret and western Kenya in general.

Sport

The Kalenjin have been called by some "the running tribe." Since the mid-1960s, Kenyan men have earned the largest share of major honours in international athletics at distances from 800 meters to the marathon; the vast majority of these Kenyan running stars have been Kalenjin. From 1980 on, about 40% of the top honours available to men in international athletics at these distances (Olympic medals, World Championships medals, and World Cross Country Championships honours) have been earned by Kalenjin.

In 2008, Pamela Jelimo became the first Kenyan woman to win a gold medal at the Olympics; she also became the first Kenyan to win the Golden League jackpot in the same year. Since then, Kenyan women have become a major presence in international athletics at the distances; most of these women are Kalenjin. Amby Burfoot of Runner's World stated that the odds of Kenya achieving the success they did at the 1988 Olympics were below 1:160 billion. Kenya had an even more successful Olympics in 2008.

A number of theories explaining the unusual athletic prowess among people from the Kalenjin-speaking people have been proposed. These include many explanations that apply equally well to other Kenyans or people living elsewhere who are not disproportionately successful athletes, such as that they run to school every day, that they live at relatively high altitude, and that the prize money from races is large compared to typical yearly earnings. One theory is that the Kalenjin have relatively thin legs and therefore do not have to lift as much leg weight when running long distances.

Notable Kalenjin People
William Ruto 5th President of Kenya
Daniel Toroitich Arap Moi 2nd President of Kenya
Kipchumba Murkomen Kenyan Minister for Roads, Infrastructure.
Eliud Kipchoge 2 time Olympic Marathon Champion and Marathon world record holder(men)
Kipchoge Keino Former 1500m world record holder
Ezekiel Kemboi Multiple world and Olympic 3000m sc champion
Brigid Kosgei Marathon record holder(women)
Joshua Cheptegei 10000m World Champion(Uganda)
Faith Kipyegon 1500m World and Olympic Champion.

See also
Kalenjin languages

Notes

Bibliography
Evans-Pritchard, E.E. (1965) 'The political structure of the Nandi-speaking peoples of Kenya', in The position of women in primitive societies and other essays in social anthropology, pp. 59–75.
https://www.amazon.de/Kalenjin-Grammar-Beginners-Complete-Textbook-ebook/dp/B09VLL15M7
Entine, Jon. (2000) 'The Kenya Connection', in TABOO: Why Black Athletes Dominate Sports And Why We're Afraid to Talk About It. https://web.archive.org/web/20081209004844/http://www.jonentine.com/reviews/quokka_03.htm
Kipchumba Foundation (2017) Aspects of Indigenous Religion among the Marakwet of Kenya, Nairobi: Kipchumba Foundation,   
Omosule, Monone (1989) 'Kalenjin: the emergence of a corporate name for the 'Nandi-speaking tribes' of East Africa', Genève-Afrique, 27, 1, pp. 73–88.
Sutton, J.E.G. (1978) 'The Kalenjin', in Ogot, B.A. (ed.) Kenya before 1900, pp. 21–52.
Larsen, Henrik B. (2002) 'Why Are Kenyan Runners Superior?'
Tanser, Toby (2008) More Fire. How to Run the Kenyan Way.
Warner, Gregory (2013) 'How One Kenyan Tribe Produces The World's Best Runners'

External links
Census: Here are the numbers
Peering Under the Hood of Africa's Runners
Biikabkutit
2020/Kalenjin tribe in Kenya
Cheptiret Online

 
 
Ethnic groups in Kenya